Branchiostegus okinawaensis is a species of marine ray-finned fish, a tilefish belonging to the family Malacanthidae. It is found in Okinawa.

References

Malacanthidae
Taxa named by Wataru Hiramatsu
Taxa named by Tetsuo Yoshino
Fish described in 2012